Boynton Beach Community High School is a public high school located in Boynton Beach, Florida, United States, and it serves grades 9–12 in the School District of Palm Beach County. Students have the opportunity to tackle AICE and Advance Placement courses to better prepare for college, the rigorous course also allow students to obtain college credits. Boynton Beach community High School has partnerships with Embry Riddle Aeronautical University, Palm Beach State College, and Florida Atlantic University where students can dual-enroll to obtain college credit while being in high school. Boynton Beach High school has been rated a "C" for the year 2017–2018 by the Florida Department of Education and School District of Palm Beach County.

Academic programs 
Boynton Beach Community High school offers a variety of programs such as Aerospace Science, Dance, Digital Media, Early Childhood, Information Technology, Marine Corps JROTC, Medical Sciences,  Music - Instrumental,  Music - Vocal, Theater, and Visual Art.

Activities
Dimensional Harmony which was established the first year the school was open has achieved dramatic success earning Superiors at the district and state levels. The Dimensional Harmony group in 2015 was invited to sing in London to perform as one of seven worldwide.

The Tigers baseball team made it to state in its beginning years.

Boynton Beach Community High School offers a program that partners with Embry Riddle Aeronautical University where students are able to obtain college credits through the university.

The BASA (Boynton Aerospace Science Academy) has expanded into the Unmanned Aerial Vehicle sectors, allowing students to pursue commercial drone pilot licenses.

The Arts department of Boynton Beach High were featured on PBS "Good Sport" episode 37 inside the lobby of a local movie theater. They created a giant mural featuring the blockbuster movies from the summer of 2015.

Notable alumni
Lamar Jackson, quarterback for the Baltimore Ravens, 2019 NFL Most Valuable Player, and 2016 Heisman Trophy award while at the University of Louisville

References

High schools in Palm Beach County, Florida
Public high schools in Florida
Boynton Beach, Florida
2001 establishments in Florida
Educational institutions established in 2001